Rock moated site and medieval village is an archaeological site, including a deserted medieval village, in Worcestershire, England, near the village of Rock and about  south-west of Bewdley. It is a Scheduled Monument.

History
Rock in medieval times is known to have been larger than it now is: in 1328, Henry de Ribbesford, who held Rock, had a grant of a weekly market and of a yearly fair on the feast of St Margaret and two days following.

A moat was usually created as a status symbol, around a domestic or religious building, rather than for practical defence. The reason for this moat is not known. In a description of the village in 1924, for the Victoria County History series, it was thought to be possibly the site of a cattle enclosure.

The Church of St Peter and St Paul in Rock dates from the 12th century, with additions during the 14th century and restoration in the late 19th century.

Earthworks
The moated enclosure lies immediately south-east of the church.

Adjacent to the north-east is the site of a medieval settlement; it has been ploughed in recent times, but evidence remains of streets, orientated north-west to south-east, and homesteads of the village.

See also
 List of lost settlements in the United Kingdom

References

Deserted medieval villages in Worcestershire
Scheduled monuments in Worcestershire